Jir Deh (also Romanized as Jīr Deh; also known as Jardi, Jowr Deh, Jūr Deh, and Jurdi) is a village in Siyarastaq Yeylaq Rural District, Rahimabad District, Rudsar County, Gilan Province, Iran. At the 2006 census, its population was 71, in 28 families.

References 

Populated places in Rudsar County